The National Readership Survey was a joint venture company in the UK between the Institute of Practitioners in Advertising (IPA), the Newspaper Publishers Association (NPA) and the Periodical Publishers Association (PPA). It provided audience research for print advertising trading in the UK. The survey covered over 250 of Britain's major newspapers and magazines, showing the size and nature of the audiences they achieve. It classified audiences in a number of ways, one of which is the NRS social grade.

History
The National Readership Survey was founded in 1956 by the Institute of Practitioners in Advertising, and shortly after become a joint industry survey body, with stakeholders from throughout the publishing industry having representation within the entity. Originally, just 62 titles had a sufficiently large readership to be covered, but by 2015 there were 124, though the average readership of these titles was considerably lower.

In April 2018, the NRS was dissolved to be replaced by PAMCo.

References 

Advertising in the United Kingdom